Andrea Ferreri (13 February 1673 – 13 June 1744) was an Italian sculptor of the late Baroque. He was born in Milan, by 1683, he was found in Bologna, training with Giuseppe Maria Mazza. In 1722, he moved to Ferrara, where he soon became director of the Academy of Fine Arts. Much of his sculpture work was in stucco.

References

1673 births
1744 deaths
17th-century Italian sculptors
Italian male sculptors
18th-century Italian sculptors
Italian Baroque sculptors
18th-century Italian male artists